Viktor Schauman (1822 – 3 February 1872) was a pharmacist and notable business person and politician from Jakobstad, Finland. He was married to Elise Wilhelmina Schauman and was the father of the industrialist Wilhelm Schauman and Ossian Schauman, who later created the health organization Folkhälsan.

In 1845 he bought the Jakobstads Tobaksspinneri tobacco company together with the businessman Philip Ulric Strengberg, renaming it into "Ph. U. Strengberg & Co Tobaks-Fabrik".

He was greatly interested in gardening and the botanical garden of Jakobstad, the so-called Skolparken was created in his and his wife's memory.

References
Österbotten No. 4 (page 8) Link

1822 births
1872 deaths
People from Jakobstad
People from Vaasa Province (Grand Duchy of Finland)
Swedish-speaking Finns
Finnish people of German descent
Finnish pharmacists